The 2005 Cyprus Rally was the sixth round of the 2005 World Rally Championship season. It took place between May 13–15, 2005.

Results

Special Stages
All dates and times are EEST (UTC+3).

External links

Results at eWRC-results.com

Cyprus
Cyprus Rally
Rally